The 1997 Coupe de France Final was a football match held at the Parc des Princes, Paris on 10 May 1997, that saw Nice defeat Guingamp in a penalty shoot out. After normal time and extra-time could not separate the two sides, the match was to be decided on penalty kicks. Stéphane Carnot and Claude Michel missed for Guingamp, while only Louis Gomis missed for Nice. This final was the last Coupe de France final held at the Parc des Princes, with the following year's final held at the new Stade de France.

Match details

See also
Coupe de France 1996-97

External links
Coupe de France results at Rec.Sport.Soccer Statistics Foundation
Report on French federation site

Coupe
1997
Coupe De France Final 1997
Coupe De France Final 1997
Coupe de France Final 1997
Coupe de France Final
Coupe de France Final